Big Nasty Creek is a stream in the U.S. state of South Dakota.

Some believe Big Nasty received its name from its discolored water, others say the stream was "nasty to cross", while still others say the name was descriptive of the cowboys who frequented the area.

See also
List of rivers of South Dakota

References

Rivers of Harding County, South Dakota
Rivers of Perkins County, South Dakota
Rivers of South Dakota